Santa Cruz Metropolitan Transit District (SCMTD), or simply Santa Cruz METRO, provides bus service throughout Santa Cruz County, California.

Santa Cruz METRO also operates the Highway 17 Express service for Amtrak Thruway between the city of Santa Cruz and San Jose Diridon station, in partnership with Amtrak California and the Santa Clara Valley Transportation Authority.

History 

Santa Cruz METRO was created in 1968 as a special district within Santa Cruz County with taxing authority. Service was initially to the cities of Santa Cruz, Capitola and Live Oak. Santa Cruz METRO extended service to Watsonville, Scotts Valley and the San Lorenzo Valley in 1974.

In 1979, voters approved a measure to change the financing of Santa Cruz METRO from a property tax to a 1/2 cent sales tax.

The Amtrak Thruway Highway 17 Express service between Santa Cruz and San Jose started as an emergency bus service after the 1989 Loma Prieta earthquake closed Highway 17.

A strike in September 2005 lasted for 35 days and stranded up to 23,000 riders.

In 2011 fixed route service was severely cut then restored mere months later.

In 2012 Santa Cruz METRO received grant funding to construct the Judy K. Souza Operations Facility.

Year Round Routes 
Route 4 – Harvey West/Emeline
Route 10 – UCSC via Main Gate – High
Route 17 – Highway 17 Express
Route 18 – UCSC via Main Gate – Mission
Route 19 – UCSC via West Gate – Bay
Route 20 – UCSC via Main Gate – Delaware/Western
Route 22 – UCSC via Main Gate – Almar/Bay
Route 35 – Highway 9/Scotts Valley
Route 42 – Davenport/Bonny Doon
Route 55 – Cabrillo – Rio Del Mar
Route 66 – Live Oak/17th
Route 68 – Broadway/Portola
Route 69A/69W – Capitola/Cabrillo/Airport
Route 71 – Soquel/Freedom
Route 72 – Green Valley – Hospital
Route 72W – Green Valley – Corralitos
Route 74S – Pajaro Valley High School/Hospital
Route 75 – Green Valley – Wheelock
Route 79 – East Lake
Route WC – Watsonville Circulator
Route 91X – Cabrillo Express

Routes operating only during UCSC terms 
Route 15 – UCSC via Laurel West

Discontinued Routes 
Route 1 – University
Route 1B – University/Lower Bay
Route 1H – University/High
Route 1L – University/Laurel
Route 1W – University/Walnut
Route 1Y – University Shuttle
Route 2 – Western Drive
Route 3A – Mission/Delaware
Route 3B – Mission/Natural Bridges
Route 3C – Mission/Lighthouse
Route 4 – Harvey West
Route 5 – Delavega
Route 6 – Seabright
Route 7 – Beach
Route 7N – Beach Night
Route 8 – Emeline
Route 9 – Stroke Center
Route 11 – UC/Westside
Route 12 – UCSC/East Side Direct
Route 13 – UCSC via Walnut
Route 20D – UCSC via Delaware
Route 22 – UCSC/Coastal Science Campus
Route 27X – UCSC Express
Route 30 – Graham/Scotts Valley
Route 31 – Scotts Valley via Highway 17
Route 33 – Lompico SLV/Felton Faire
Route 34 – South Felton
Route 36 – Valley/Santa Cruz Express
Route 51 – Soquel/Clares
Route 52 – Capitola/Soquel
Route 54 – Aptos/La Selva
Route 54A – Aptos
Route 56 – Depot Hill
Route 56 – La Selva
Route 57 – Capitola
Route 58 – Park Avenue
Route 60A/B – Soquel
Route 61 – Dominican
Route 62 – Dominican/17th
Route 63 – Dominican
Route 65 – Live Oak via 30th
Route 67 – Live Oak via East Cliff
Route 69 – 41st Avenue
Route 69C – Cabrillo
Route 69N – Cabrillo Night
Route 70 – Santa Cruz/Cabrillo
Route 73 – Airport/Buena Vista
Route 74 – Shady Oaks
Route 76 – Bay Village
Route 77 – Industrial
Route 80 – Westridge Drive
Route 81 – Capitola Mall/Watsonville
Route 88 – Armory Shuttle
Route 93 – Watsonville Express

Metro Bus Fleet

References

External links 
 Santa Cruz Metropolitan Transit District
 United Transportation Union Local 23 represents SCMTD bus operators.
 Santa Cruz Metro routes and descriptions
 Local 521 – Santa Cruz METRO SEIU

Public transportation in Santa Cruz County, California
Bus transportation in California
Transportation in Santa Clara County, California